Digital Orca is a 2009 sculpture of a killer whale by Douglas Coupland, installed next to the Vancouver Convention Centre in Vancouver, British Columbia, Canada. The powder coated aluminium sculpture on a stainless steel frame is owned by Pavco, a crown corporation of British Columbia which operates BC Place Stadium and the Vancouver Convention Centre.

History

The sculpture was installed in 2009 and commissioned by the city of Vancouver.

In 2022, a group protesting the logging of old-growth forests in British Columbia spray painted landmarks around Vancouver, including Digital Orca.

Description

The sculpture is located at Jack Poole Plaza in Vancouver, Canada. The sculpture depicts a killer whale created by black and white cubes. The sculpture has a steel armature and aluminum cladding.

Reception

It was described as "both beautiful and bizarre" in Architectural Design. John Ortved in Vogue said the statue "grapples with modernization and the digital age" by making the killer whale less scary.

See also
 2009 in art

References

External links

 
 

2009 establishments in British Columbia
2009 sculptures
Aluminium sculptures in Canada
Animal sculptures in Canada
Coal Harbour
Outdoor sculptures in Vancouver
Stainless steel sculptures
Steel sculptures in Canada
Tourist attractions in Vancouver
Whales in art
Works by Canadian people